The St Arnaud Box-Ironbark Region is a 481 km2 fragmented and irregularly shaped tract of land that encompasses all the box-ironbark forest and woodland remnants used as winter feeding habitat by swift parrots in the St Arnaud-Stawell region of central Victoria, south-eastern Australia.

Description
The site lies west of the Maryborough-Dunolly Box-Ironbark Region Important Bird Area (IBA).  It includes the St Arnaud Range National Park, several nature reserves and state forests, with a few small blocks of private land.  It excludes other areas of woodland that are less suitable for the parrots.

Birds
The region was identified as an Important Bird Area (IBA) because, when flowering conditions are suitable it supports up to about 75 non-breeding swift parrots.  It is also home to small populations of diamond firetails and non-breeding flame robins.  Other declining woodland birds recorded from the IBA include brown treecreepers, speckled warblers, hooded and pink robins, crested bellbirds and black honeyeaters.

References

Important Bird Areas of Victoria (Australia)
Box-ironbark forest